Osvaldo Romo Mena (c. 1938 – 4 July 2007) was an agent of the Chilean Dirección de Inteligencia Nacional (DINA) from 1973 to 1990, during the military dictatorship of Augusto Pinochet. Romo was involved in the forced disappearance of over one hundred people, including Christians for Socialism and MIR members Diana Arón Svigilsky, Manuel Cortez Joo and Ofelio Lazo. He was sentenced to life imprisonment, but several of the sentences were suspended by the Chilean Supreme Court.

Life
Osvaldo Romo became known in working-class neighborhoods before Pinochet's coup in 1973 as a leftist activist, member of the Popular Socialist Union (USOPO) and MIR sympathizer. Following the coup, he reappeared in these neighborhoods in a military uniform, arresting his friends and contacts. There are still debates in left-wing circles over whether Romo suddenly changed his political orientation or if he had always been a mole for the Chilean security services.

Known as Guatón Romo ("Fatso Romo") or Comandante Raúl, he was one of DINA's key torturers, operating in centers such as Villa Grimaldi. On April 11, 1995, in an interview televised by Univisión, he commented in great detail, and evidently without remorse, on the techniques that had been used in the centers. These included the application of electricity to women's nipples and genitals, the use of dogs, and insertion of rats into women's vaginas.

Life in Brazil and arrest
In 1977, Romo was sent to Brazil by his superiors, and may have participated in death squads there, according to human rights NGOs. During Chile's transition to democracy, as one of the most important figures of the Pinochet regime, Romo was sought by prosecutors and found living in São Paulo with his wife and five children in June 1992.

Arrested by the Brazilian police, he was extradited to Chile in November 1992. He was sentenced to ten years in prison for the kidnapping of MIR member Manuel Cortez Joo and five years and a day for the kidnapping of Ofelio Lazo, who was disappeared in July 1974.

Romo, suffering from diabetes and heart failure, was moved to the hospital of Santiago Penitentiary on 3 July 2007, and died the following day. His funeral was held on 5 July at the Cementerio General de Santiago, with no one in attendance.

References

1938 births
2007 deaths
Chilean anti-communists
Chilean kidnappers
People of the Dirección de Inteligencia Nacional
Chilean people who died in prison custody
Prisoners who died in Chilean detention
People extradited from Brazil
People extradited to Chile
Operation Condor
Torture in Chile
People convicted of kidnapping